Henry Barnes may refer to:

Henry Barnes (musician), founder of several powerviolence and hardcore punk bands
Henry Barnes (traffic engineer) (1906–1968), American traffic engineer
Henry Barnes, 2nd Baron Gorell (1882–1917), barrister, died while serving in World War I
Henry Edwin Barnes (1848–1896), English ornithologist
Henry Winslow Barnes (1818–1873), American politician in Wisconsin

See also 
Harry Barnes (disambiguation)